Stickle Bricks are a construction toy primarily intended for toddlers invented by Denys Fisher in 1969. The brand is owned by Hasbro, and as of 2016 is sub-licensed to Flair Leisure Products plc.

Description
An individual stickle brick is a colourful plastic shape a few centimeters long which has a "brush" of small plastic "fingers" on one or more surfaces. The fingers of adjacent stickle bricks can interlock, allowing them to be joined in various ways. Standard sets of stickle bricks contain triangular, square and rectangular pieces. Many recent sets also include other types of pieces such as heads, wheels and teddy bear shapes.

History
Stickle Bricks were invented in 1969 by Denys Fisher.

From 2001 to 2008, GP Flair was the British distributor of the bricks. In October 2015, Flair licensed the bricks along with Mr. Frosty from Hasbro starting in 2016.

Similar toys
Several companies manufacture similar toys, not all of them compatible. Names for these toys include "Nopper", "Bristle Blocks", "Fun Bricks", "Clipo", "Krinkles", "Multi-Fit", and "Thistle Blocks".

References

External links 
 

1970s toys
Construction toys
Hasbro products
Products introduced in 1969